The Honoré Mercier Hospital is the major hospital in Saint-Hyacinthe, Quebec, Canada. It serves Saint-Hyacinthe its surrounding Les Maskoutains Regional County Municipality, as well as the neighbouring Acton Regional County Municipality and La Vallée-du-Richelieu Regional County Municipality.

It currently has 213 acute care, 35 short-term psychiatric and 25 mental health shelter beds (Saint-Charles Pavilion).

The hospital is named for Honoré Mercier, a lawyer, journalist and politician best known for being the ninth Premier of Quebec from 27 January 1887 to 21 December 1891.

History
Hôpital Saint-Charles (Saint-Charles Hospital) opened at the request of Monseigneur Louis-Zéphirin Moreau in 1902 as the first hospital in Saint-Hyacinthe. In 1928, construction began on the new Saint-Charles Hospital in its current location, with the hospital opening in 1930. The hospital was renamed Hôpital Général de Saint-Hyacinthe (Saint-Hyacinthe General Hospital) in 1964.

In 1968, the Hôpital Honoré-Mercier Corporation was created. On 13 November 1971, Hôpital Honoré-Mercier was inaugurated. The hospital was renamed Centre hospitalier Honoré-Mercier Inc. in 1984. A new emergency room opened on 26 April 1994. From June 2001 to April 2007, the hospital was renovated to correct water infiltration problems in the building. In 2004, the Hervé-Gagnon Pavilion opened, named for a longtime doctor of the hospital.

References

External links
Official website

Hospital buildings completed in 1971
Buildings and structures in Saint-Hyacinthe
Hospitals in Quebec
Hospitals established in 1902